The 1973 Polish Rally (formally the 33rd Polish Rally) was the seventh round of the inaugural World Rally Championship season.  Run in mid-July in southern Poland, this marked to only year in which Poland (or any member of the Warsaw Pact) was part of the WRC calendar until 36 years later in 2009.  This edition was also notable for the fact that of the 62 teams which began the rally, only three completed it, a record that stands today.

Report 
In 1973, and for several years afterward, only manufacturers were given points for finishes in WRC events.  Despite the misfortune of most of the teams, Fiat was able to finally gain a win for their Fiat Abarth 124 Rallye.  As no other major competitors were able to complete the rally, the win was by a substantial margin, the German driver outpacing the next finisher by nearly three hours.

Results 

Source: Independent WRC archive

Championship standings after the event

References

External links 
 Official website of the World Rally Championship
 1973 Rally Poland at Rallye-info 

Polish
Rally of Poland
1973 in Polish sport